Emergent is the second and last album by American progressive rock band Gordian Knot, and is the only album apart from Focus to contain all original members of Cynic.

Track listing 
"Arsis" – 1:59
"Muttersprache" – 6:26
"A Shaman's Whisper" – 6:33
"Fischer's Gambit" – 5:43
"Grace" (Live) – 8:27
"Some Brighter Thing" – 7:34
"The Brook the Ocean" – 4:06
"Singing Deep Mountain" – 9:00
"Surround Me" (Japan Bonus Track) – 5:28

Musicians 
Sean Malone (Cynic) - bass guitar, Chapman stick, fretless guitar, keyboards, e-bow, echoplex, loops, vocals
Paul Masvidal (Cynic) - guitars, vocals
Bob Brunin (Aerial Surface) - guitars, fretless guitars, vocals
Jason Göbel (ex-Cynic) - guitars
Jim Matheos (Fates Warning, OSI, Arch/Matheos) - acoustic guitars
Steve Hackett (ex-Genesis) - guitars
Sean Reinert (ex-Cynic) - drums, v-drums, percussion
Bill Bruford (ex-Yes, ex-King Crimson) - drums
Sonia Lynn - vocals

References

2003 albums
Gordian Knot (band) albums